Bill George is a visual effects supervisor who is known for his work for Industrial Light & Magic on, amongst others, the Star Trek franchise.

Biography 
During his teens, Bill George was a dedicated and talented model maker. He used to forage through the dumpsters outside the Van Nuys, Los Angeles facility of Industrial Light & Magic, hoping to find souvenirs. In 1979, he began his career, building miniatures for Greg Jein in Los Angeles. In 1981, he joined Industrial Light & Magic. Over the years, he has worked in a variety of capacities. He has been a model shop supervisor, art director, matte painter and visual effects supervisor. Some career highlights include miniature construction and design on Blade Runner, art direction and design for five Star Trek feature films, directing over thirty television commercials at ILM and overseeing model construction on Ghostbusters II and Alive.

In 1988, George received the Best Visual Effects Academy Award for his work on Innerspace.

Awards

Select filmography

References

External links 
 

American art directors
Best Visual Effects Academy Award winners
Living people
Visual effects supervisors
Year of birth missing (living people)